Nagarjunsagar-Srisailam Tiger Reserve is the largest tiger reserve in India. The reserve spreads over five districts, Kurnool District, Prakasam District, Guntur District, Nalgonda District and Mahabub Nagar district. The reservoirs and temples of Srisailam are major attraction for many tourists and pilgrims. It is the largest tiger reserve forest in India and is located inside Nallamala forest area.

Geography

This reserve is located between longitude: 78°30' to 79°28' east and latitude: 15°53' to 16°43' north.

The hill ranges contain a number of plateaus, of which, Amrabad, Srisailam, Peddacheruvu, Sivapuram, and Nekkanti are noteworthy. Nagarjunasagar receives rains from the southwest monsoon, which is active from the second half of June to the end of September. There are several waterfalls in the reserve such as the Ethipothala Falls, Pedda Dukudu, Gundam and Chaleswaram.

Ancient history
The ancient temples at Srisailam of Lord Mallikarjuna and his consort goddess Bhramaramba, an incarnation of Parvathi as the fair-complexioned boon from Brahma, contain one of the twelve sacred Shaiva Jyotirlingas and one of the eighteen Maha Shakthi peethas in India.

This area contains ruins of Nagarjuna Viswa Vidyalayam. The site was once the location of many Buddhist universities and monasteries.

The ruins of a fort of the 3rd century BCE Indian ruler, Ikshwaku Chandragupta overlook the Nirjivapuram (Lifeless city) valley. The ancient fort of king Pratap Rudra of the Kakatiya dynasty and several other forts are visible on the banks of the Krishna River. An ancient  wall constructed there by the Kakateeyas is an impressive historic feature.

This area contains several rock shelters and cave temples including: Akka Mahadevi Bhilam, Dattatreya Bhilam, Umaa Maheswaram, Kadalivanam, and Palankasari.

Flora
The main types of forest biomes in the reserve are: southern tropical dry mixed deciduous forest, Hardwickia forest and Deccan thorn scrub forests with much Euphorbia scrub.  Important plant species here are: Anogeissus latifolia (axlewood), Cleisthanthus collinus (odcha), Terminalia spp., Pterocarpus marsupium, Hardwickia binata (anjan tree), Boswellia serrata (Indian frankincense or salai), Tectona grandis (teak), Mundulea sericea and Albizia spp. (silkplants).

Fauna
The main mammals in the reserve are: Bengal tiger, Indian leopard, sloth bear, Ussuri dhole, Indian pangolin, chital, sambar deer, chevrotain, blackbuck, chinkara and chowsingha. Lesser fauna include mugger crocodile, Indian python, Indian cobra, rat snake, Bengal monitor, Indian star tortoise and Indian peafowl. Endemic reptiles like the skinks Ashwamedh writhing skink, Sharma's mabuya lizards and the Nagarjun Sagar racer snake, Wildboar, Mongoose, Porcupine are particular highlights of this region.

References

Tiger reserves of India
Wildlife sanctuaries in Andhra Pradesh
Wildlife sanctuaries of Telangana
Eastern Ghats
Central Deccan Plateau dry deciduous forests
1983 establishments in Andhra Pradesh
Protected areas established in 1983